With Oden on Our Side is the sixth full-length studio album by the Swedish death metal band Amon Amarth, and their first album to enter the Billboard charts, the Top Heatseekers and the Independent Albums chart, peaking at number 15 and number 26 respectively.

It was recorded in May and June 2006 and was released in Europe on 22 September 2006 by Metal Blade Records and Sony BMG. A limited edition digipak was also released with a second disc that includes live songs, demos, and unreleased recordings. With Oden on Our Side was also released on a limited red LP. The songs "Runes to My Memory" and "Cry of the Black Birds" were both made into music videos, with the first single being featured in the 2011 video game Saints Row: The Third by developer Volition.

Style 
With Oden on Our Side takes on a heavier approach compared to their previous album Fate of Norns; according to vocalist Johan Hegg, in an interview with Dutch metal magazine Aardschok, the album would go back to their roots such as their debut, Once Sent from the Golden Hall. When asked about the meaning of the album's title, Hegg remarked:

Cover art 
The album cover art features the Norse God Odin riding on his fabled octopedal horse Sleipnir in a depiction borrowed from the Tjängvide image stone. The background depicts the Valknut, a symbol whose meaning is uncertain, though archeological evidence suggests it to be associated with Odin. Letters of the Runic alphabet can be seen on the edges of the triangles forming the Valknut.  The Runes on top spell out "With Oden on our Side", whereas the bottom right runes spell "Amon Amarth" using characters from the Elder Futhark.

Reception 

Since its release, With Oden on Our Side has received favorable reviews. Greg Prato of AllMusic gave the album three and a half stars naming it a competent example of the melodic death metal genre, stating that Johan Hegg's vocals complement the Iron Maiden-esque guitar riffing from Olavi Mikkonen and Johan Söderberg. Blabbermouth.net gave With Oden on Our Side a score of 8 out of 10 comparing its quality to that of Versus the World and Fate of Norns.

Accolades

Track listing

Credits

Personnel

Amon Amarth 
 Johan Hegg − vocals
 Olavi Mikkonen − lead guitar
 Johan Söderberg − rhythm guitar
 Ted Lundström − bass
 Fredrik Andersson − drums

Production 
 Jens Bogren – production, engineering, mixing
 Anders "Shadow" Ström – additional recording
 Thomas Eberger – mastering

Studios 
 Fascination Street studios, Örebro, Sweden
 Cutting Room, Stockholm – mastering
 Amon Amarth's rehearsal studio – recording (2006 demos)
 Sunlight Studio – recording (1997 demos)

Charts

References

External links 
 
 With Oden on Our Side at Amon Amarth's official website
 With Oden on Our Side at Metal Blade Records

2006 albums
Amon Amarth albums
Metal Blade Records albums
Albums produced by Jens Bogren